Bar Kuh (also Romanized as Bār Kūh, Bar-e Kūh, Barkooh, and Barkūh) is a village in Momenabad Rural District, in the Central District of Sarbisheh County, South Khorasan Province, Iran. At the 2006 census, its population was 185, in 61 families.

References 

Populated places in Sarbisheh County